Port of San Pedro de Macoris is located on the Higuamo river, San Pedro de Macoris, Dominican Republic. This port is mainly used to discharge bulk fertilizer, cement, clinker, coal, wheat, diesel and LPG. It is also used to export sugar and molasses produced by several sugar cane mills in the region.

Overview

The Port of San Pedro de Macoris is the oldest harbor in the country; It was built by the end if the 19th century.
This port used to receive most of the operations for the Port of Santo Domingo, because this one was unable to handle that capacity of boats in that moment.

SPM Port received operations from Europe and the United States.

This harbor became the Pan American World Airways hydro-hub for air operations making at the same time, the port to be unable to keep receiving maritime operations.

This terminal is currently being restructured and recuperated and is handling individual cargo operations.

See also 
 List of ports and harbours of the Atlantic Ocean

Port information 
 Location: 
 Local time: UTC−4
 Weather/climate/prevailing winds:  From May 15 until September 15
 Climate: mostly sunny, tropical. Hurricane season runs from June to November
 Prevailing winds: direction ENE–ESE
 Average temperature range: 28C–30 °C

References 
 Port of San Pedro de Macoris (Spanish)

Ports and harbours of the Dominican Republic
Urban planning in the Dominican Republic
San Pedro de Macorís
Buildings and structures in San Pedro de Macorís Province